Pornography legalization in the Czech Republic started in 1993 following the Velvet Revolution, when the country went from being communist to being a liberal democracy. The possession, manufacturing, and distribution of child pornography is illegal in the Czech Republic and is punishable by up to 8 years in prison. Possession of child pornography was made illegal in 2007 and carries a penalty of up to 2 years in prison. According to the Czech penal code, sale and distribution of pornography depicting violence among people or sexual intercourse with animals is banned with a penalty of up to 1 year in prison.

References

Czech pornography